Aaron Hopkins (born 12 September 1979 in Busselton, Western Australia) is a field hockey defender from Australia. He narrowly missed selection in Australia's Olympic Games squads in both 2004 and 2008. He did, however, win two gold medals for Australia at the 2002 and 2006 Commonwealth Games.

International tournaments
 2001 – Champions Trophy, Rotterdam (2nd)
 2002 – World Cup, Kuala Lumpur (2nd)
 2002 – Commonwealth Games, Manchester (1st)
 2003 – Champions Trophy, Amstelveen (2nd)
 2005 – Champions Trophy, Chennai (1st)
 2006 – Commonwealth Games, Melbourne (1st)

References

External links
 
 
 

1979 births
Australian male field hockey players
Male field hockey defenders
Living people
People from Busselton
Commonwealth Games gold medallists for Australia
Field hockey players at the 2002 Commonwealth Games
2002 Men's Hockey World Cup players
Field hockey players at the 2006 Commonwealth Games
2006 Men's Hockey World Cup players
Field hockey people from Western Australia
Commonwealth Games medallists in field hockey
Medallists at the 2002 Commonwealth Games
Medallists at the 2006 Commonwealth Games